Martina Hingis and Mahesh Bhupathi defeated Elena Likhovtseva and Daniel Nestor in the final, 6–3, 6–3 to win the mixed doubles tennis title at the 2006 Australian Open. With the win, Bhupathi completed the career Grand Slam in mixed doubles, becoming the 14th player to do so. It was Hingis' first major mixed doubles title; she would later also complete the career Grand Slam in the discipline.

Samantha Stosur and Scott Draper were the reigning champions, but Draper retired from the sport in 2005. Stosur partnered Paul Hanley, but lost in the semifinals to Hingis and Bhupathi.

Seeds

Draw

Finals

Top half

Bottom half

External links
 Official Results Archive (Australian Open)
 Official Results Archive (WTA)
 2006 Australian Open – Doubles draws and results at the International Tennis Federation

Mixed Doubles
2006